Sri Pralayakala Veerabhadra temple, located in Gavipura, Guddadahallii, Bangalore, is a temple dedicated to the Hindu deity Pralayakala Veerabadrar.

Reference List 

Hindu temples in Bangalore